Swaragini — Jodein Rishton Ke Sur (Swaragini — Join the Melody of Relationships) is an Indian Hindi-language television drama series that premiered on 2 March 2015 on Colors TV. Produced by Rashmi Sharma under the Rashmi Sharma Telefilms, it starred Helly Shah, Tejasswi Prakash, Varun Kapoor, and Namish Taneja. The show ended on 14 December 2016, completing 469 episodes.

Plot
Swara, a liberal middle-class Bengali girl lives with her single mother Sharmishtha Bose. Ragini has been raised as a traditional Marwari by her single father Shekhar Gadodia, as her mother died. Swara and Ragini soon become friends, but learn they're half-sisters as Swara is Shekhar and Sharmishtha's daughter. Previously Shekhar's mother Parvati had separated them and married him off to Janki when Sharmishtha was pregnant with Swara. Back to present, Swara and Ragini unite and get Sharmishtha and Shekhar married.

As Ragini's fiancé Lakshya falls for Swara, Ragini lies that she betrayed him and marries Lakshya, whose cousin Sanskaar and Swara fall in love and marry. Ragini tries to make trouble for Swara, but is exposed and kicked out. She apologizes for her mistakes. Still vengeful for Ragini's lies, Lakshya leaves her and marries Kavya, his evil lover who just wants his property. Swara and Ragini expose her. Kavya is jailed after trying to kill them. Lakshya realises he loves Ragini, and they unite and consummate their marriage.

Sharmishtha gets pregnant but Parvati does not agree due to being middle aged. She wants her to get an abortion.

A boy named Rajat traps Sanskar's sister in his love for the Maheswari wealth but Swara discovers his ploy and with the help of Sanskar, Lakshaya and Ragini,they expose him. In an attempt to arrest Rajat, he kidnaps Swara. Due to circumstances, Sanskar ends shooting Rajat to save Swara and she falls off the cliff.

A rockstar named Sahil saves Swara. Swara has lost her memory and can longer recognise Sanskar and his family. Sahil gets obsessed with Swara and tries to kidnap her. Swara regains her memory. Sahil tries to kidnap Swara again and kill Sanskar but he is arrested with the help of his mother Maya.

Sharmishtha falls down the stairs and has a miscarriage. Later it is revealed that Parvati caused the miscarriage and that Sharmishtha gave birth to a boy who is still alive. Parvati ordered the nurse to abandon the boy on the streets with a beggar. Swara discovers this.

Adarsh and Parneeti turn on the Maheswari family and blackmail Swara and Ragini into getting Durga Prasad to transfer the property in his name in exchange for their brother which they earlier kidnapped. Ragini and Swara rescue their brother. Adarsh throws the Maheswari family out of the house. He causes misunderstandings between Swara, Ragini, Lakshaya and Sanskar. But Swara and Ragini overcome them and unite. They manage to defeat Parneeti and Adarsh and have him arrested. Durga Prasad disowns him. Shekhar expels Parvati from the house. Lakshaya disappears and Swara blames Sanskar. Swara and Ragini move back to their parents' house.

Six months later
Lakshya is alive, posing as Abhimanyu Khanna, a dead person as he blames himself for his accidental death. He lives with Abhimanyu's wife Mansi and daughter Mishka. Swara's friend Nikhil arrives from Canada. It turns out that Mishka is Nikhil and Mansi's daughter through an affair, and they'd killed Abhimanyu to get his property. Swara, Ragini, Lakshya and Sanskaar unite as they expose Nikhil and Mansi. Lakshya and Ragini adopt Mishka.

Cast

Main
Helly Shah as Swara Sanskaar Maheshwari: Shekhar and Sharmishtha's daughter; Ragini and  Ayush's elder sister. Sanskaar's wife (2015–16)
Tejasswi Prakash as Ragini Gadodia Maheshwari: Shekhar and Janki's daughter; Sharmishtha's adoptive daughter; Swara's younger sister and Ayush's elder sister.Lakshya's wife; Mishka mother (2015–16)
Varun Kapoor as Sanskaar Maheshwari: Ram and Sujata's son-elder brother of Lakshya and Uttara.younger brother of Adarsh. Swara's husband (2015–16)
Namish Taneja as Lakshya Maheshwari: Durga and Annapurna's son-younger brother of Adarsh,and Sanskaar.elder brother of Uttara. Ragini's husband; Mishka father. (2015–16)

Recurring
Parineeta Borthakur as Sharmishtha Bose Gadodia: Shobha's daughter; Shekhar's second wife; Swara and Ayush's mother; Ragini's foster mother (2015–16)
Sachin Tyagi as Shekhar Gadodia: Deendayal and Parvati's son; Janki and Sharmishtha's husband; Swara, Ragini and Ayush's father (2015–16)
Anuj Sachdeva as Sahil Sengupta: Rockstar; Maya's son; Swara's obsessive lover (2016)
Shalini Kapoor Sagar as Annapurna Maheshwari: Durgaprasad's wife; Adarsh and Lakshya's mother (2015–16)
Nagesh Salwan as Durgaprasad "Durga" Maheshwari: Ram's brother; Annapurna's husband; Adarsh and Lakshya's father (2015–16)
Sonica Handa as Sujata Maheshwari: Ram's wife; Sanskaar and Uttara's mother (2015–16)
Amar Sharma as Ramprasad "Ram" Maheshwari; Durga's brother; Sujata's husband; Sanskaar and Uttara's father (2015–16)
Tarun Singh as Adarsh Maheshwari: Durga and Annapurna's son; Lakshya's brother; Sanskaar and Uttara's cousin; Parineeta's husband (2015–16)
Ekta Methai/Khyati Mangla as Uttara Maheshwari: Ram and Sujata's daughter; Sanskaar's sister; Adarsh and Lakshya's cousin (2015–16)
Akansha Chamola as Parineeta Patil Maheshwari: Sulekha's daughter; Adarsh's wife (2015–16)
Alka Kaushal as Parvati Gadodia: Deendayal's wife; Shekhar's mother; Swara, Ragini and Ayush's grandmother (2015–16)
Abhijit Lahiri as Deendayal Gadodia: Parvati's husband; Shekhar's father; Swara, Ragini and Ayush's grandfather (2015–16)
Tanima Sen as Shobha Bose: Sharmishta's mother; Swara's grandmother (2015)
Tasheen Shah as Mishka Chatterjee/Maheshwari: Nikhil and Mansi's daughter; Lakshya and Ragini's adopted daughter (2016)
Mughdha Shah as Sulekha: Parineeta's mother (2016)
Mohit Abrol as Rajat Lodha: Uttara's ex-fiancé (2016)
Roop Durgapal as Tanya "Kavya" Malhotra Maheshwari: Kartik's sister; Lakshya's ex-wife (2016)
Mayur Verma as Karthik Malhotra: Kavya's brother (2016)
Nikita Sharma as Kavita Roy: Kaveri's daughter; Sanskaar's ex-fiancée (2015–16)
Sonia Singh as Urvashi Kataria: Janki's sister (2016)
Sonia Shah as Kaveri Roy: Kavita's mother (2016)
Nupur Alankar as Gayatri Bhandari: Chirag's mother (2016)
Manoj Chandila as Chirag Bhandari: Gayatri's son; Uttara's ex-fiancé (2016)
Pratap Hada as Nikhil Chatterjee: Swara's friend; Mansi's boyfriend; Mishka's father (2016)
Dalljiet Kaur as Janki Kataria Gadodia: Urvashi's sister; Shekhar's first wife; Ragini's mother (2015–16)

Guest appearances
 Deepika Padukone and Ranveer Singh; to promote Bajirao Mastani
 Salman Khan and Sonam K Ahuja; to promote Prem Ratan Dhan Payo
 Nishant Singh Malkani; dance performance
 Sanjeeda Sheikh; dance performance
 Dipika Kakar Ibrahim as Simar from Sasural Simar Ka
 Dheeraj Dhoopar as Prem Bharadwaj from Sasural Simar Ka
 Karan Johar, Malaika Arora Khan and Kirron Kher as judges of India's Got Talent

Crossover

Dubbed versions

Awards and nominations

References

External links

2015 Indian television series debuts
2016 Indian television series endings
Indian television soap operas
Colors TV original programming
Hindi-language television shows
Television shows set in Kolkata